Forbes Lake is a lake in Saskatchewan, Canada, located about 50 kilometres north of Otter Lake.

See also
List of lakes of Saskatchewan

References

External links
 Forbes Lake, Saskatchewan at data.gc.ca

Lakes of Saskatchewan